Vinod Tiwari was a politician from Uttar Pradesh, India. He was member of the legislative assembly representing Pharenda constituency in Maharajganj District.

References 

Living people
Members of the Uttar Pradesh Legislative Assembly
People from Uttar Pradesh
Year of birth missing (living people)
Samajwadi Party politicians from Uttar Pradesh